The Maserati Kyalami (Tipo AM129) is a four-seat GT coupé produced by Italian automobile manufacturer Maserati from 1976 to 1983. The car was named after the Kyalami Grand Prix Circuit in South Africa where a Maserati-powered Cooper T81 had won the 1967 South African Grand Prix.

History 

The Kyalami was the first new model developed under the Alejandro de Tomaso ownership. It was derived from, and mechanically virtually identical (except for some body panels) to the Longchamp, a three-box grand tourer made by De Tomaso Automobili.

When De Tomaso acquired Maserati after the demise of Citroën in 1975, he found the brand in dire financial straits. In a desperate need to develop a new flagship model to improve sales, De Tomaso had the idea to use the recently unsuccessful Longchamp as the base in order to save development costs of the new model. Pietro Frua was commissioned by De Tomaso to undertake the restyling of the Tom Tjaarda-designed Longchamp, to give the new car a distinctive Maserati feel. The edgy lines of the Longchamp were softened and the headlamps were replaced by quad round units. The car was also lowered, lengthened and widened in order to give the car a more sporty character. This move was disdained by purists and this showed in the form of declining interest in the car.

The interior was also upgraded to incorporate classic Maserati elements such as the steering wheel and Instrumentation. It was upholstered in premium Connolly leather and had plush carpeting. The boxy design for the roof meant that the car could easily seat taller passengers. A quad overhead camshaft Maserati 90° V8 engine was utilised to power the car, as opposed to the American-sourced Ford V8 which was used in the Longchamp. The Kyalami was the last car to use this engine. Exactly 200 units were built of which 54 RHD before it was quietly discontinued. Most of them were blue, only 12 in brown and of which only 3 in combination with light tan leather upholstery.

Specifications and performance 

The Kyalami was launched at the 1976 Geneva Motor Show and was initially powered by a  4.2 litre V8 engine which had a redline of 6,000 rpm. Both engines were coupled with a ZF five-speed manual transmission or upon request a three-speed Borg Warner automatic transmission and were equipped with Weber downdraft carburettors and a dry sump lubrication system. Most Kyalamis built received the manual transmission.

Mechanically, the Kyalami was closely related to the contemporary Quattroporte III, which was also offered with the same engines but with a Chrysler built automatic transmission instead of the Borg Warner unit. In recent comparison tests, the Kyalami proved to be a better car than the Longchamp it was based on, primarily due to the use of a manual transmission.

A convertible prototype was built by Carrozzeria Frua but was rejected by Maserati. Nonetheless, a few customers demanded such a variant and an independent German tuning company began offering a conversion to the convertible bodystyle. At least two cars have been known to be converted. Both of these employed the 4.2 litre engine.

References

Sources

External links
 The Kyalami, www.maserati-alfieri.co.uk

Kyalami
Grand tourers
Rear-wheel-drive vehicles
1980s cars
Cars introduced in 1976